Kolossos Rodou B.C. (Greek: Κολοσσός Ρόδου K.A.E.), known as Kolossos H Hotels for sponsorship reasons, is a Greek professional basketball team that is located on the island of Rhodes, in Rhodes City. Kolossos currently plays in the top-tier level of Greek professional basketball, the Greek League. The club was founded in 1963, and also initially featured sports like volleyball and judo in the early 1980s. Today, the focus of the Greek athletic club is on the franchise's men's basketball department.

History

Early years
Due to geographical isolation, and very small financial abilities for most of the club's history, the basketball team was not able to compete at a high level for many years, and was not funded properly. Kolossos was the first Greek basketball team located in the Aegean Sea region.

Rise
In 2000, the fate of the team finally changed, when Kostas Kostaridis became the new team President, and took over the reins of the club. Kostaridis changed almost the entire club management, and stated that it was the immediate goal of the team to rise from the 3rd-tier level Greek B League, to the 2nd-tier level Greek A2 League, and subsequently, the team did begin to rise up through Greece's club basketball league system.

In 2003, head coach Vassilis Fragkias joined the team, and the ascent up into the Greek A2 League division commenced. In the 2004–05 season, Kolossos won the championship of the Greek A2 League, and was therefore automatically promoted up into the top-tier level Greek League, the highest professional basketball league in Greece.

Merger with Holargos
In the 2018–19 Greek Basket League season, Kolossos finished in last place in the league. The team was thus facing relegation down to the second-tier level Greek A2 League. However, Kolossos merged with Holargos, and gained their rights to play in the top-tier level Greek League, in the following 2019–20 Greek Basket League season.

Arenas
Through the 2018–19 season, Kolossos played its domestic Greek Basket League games at the 1,242 seat Venetokleio Indoor Hall. Prior to the 2019–20 season, Kolossos moved into the 1,400 seat Palais des Sports.

Season by season

Honours and titles
Greek 2nd Division
Champion (1): 2004–05

Players

Current roster

Depth chart

Notable players

 Antonios Asimakopoulos
 Kostas Charissis
 Georgios Diamantopoulos
 Ioannis Georgallis
 Panagiotis Kafkis
 Georgios Kalaitzis
 Giannis Kalampokis
 Nestoras Kommatos
 Giannoulis Larentzakis
 Sotirios Manolopoulos
 Vangelis Margaritis
 Dimitrios Mavroeidis
 Spyros Panteliadis
 Nikos Papanikolopoulos
 Nikos Pappas
 Christos Saloustros
 Christoforos Stefanidis
 Vassilis Toliopoulos
 Dimitrios Tsaldaris
 Georgios Tsalmpouris
 Angelos Tsamis
 Panagiotis Vasilopoulos
 Vassilis Xanthopoulos
 Theodoros Zaras
- Pat Calathes
- Steve Panos
- Mladen Pantić
- Franko Nakić
 Jurica Golemac
 Roope Ahonen
  Tom Liden
  Stevan Nađfeji
  Miroslav Todić
  Saša Vasiljević
  Mihajlo Andrić
  Stefan Momirov
  Stefan Pot
  Kerem Kanter
 Kim Tillie
  Danny Agbelese
 Dominic Artis
 Tyrone Brazelton
 Travon Bryant
 LaRon Dendy
 Robert Dozier
 John Edwards
 Jordan Floyd
 Gary McGhee
 Kenny Goins
 Malcolm Griffin
 Jamelle Hagins
 Langston Hall
 Lance Harris
 Marcus Hatten
 Scotty Hopson
 Mike James
 Jared Jordan
 Lasan Kromah
 Kevin Langford
 Ty Lawson
 Kelvin Lewis
 Steve Logan
 Shonn Miller
 Bambale Osby
 J. R. Pinnock
 Juvonte Reddic
 Trevor Releford
 Steven Smith
 Taylor Smith
 Curtis Stinson
 Dominic Waters
 Glynn Watson Jr.
 Kenny Williams

Head coaches

References

External links
Official website 
Eurobasket.com Team Page

 
Basketball teams established in 1963
Basketball teams in Greece
Rhodes (city)